The  Basilica Menor de San Pedro Bautista (Minor Basilica of Saint Pedro Bautista), also known as the San Francisco del Monte Church is a parish church in the San Francisco del Monte district of Quezon City, in the Philippines.  It is one of the oldest churches in the country having founded in 1590.  The church is dedicated to its founder Padre Pedro Bautista (Peter Baptist), a Spanish missionary from Ávila, Spain, one of the 26 Christians martyred in Japan in 1597.

The shrine belongs to the Diocese of Cubao under the Vicariate of Saint Pedro Bautista. It is also under the administration of the Franciscans or the Order of Friars Minor (OFM), from the Franciscan Province of Saint Pedro Bautista.

History 
When Pedro Bautista was elected custos, an official of the Franciscans, he saw the need for a secluded place where the missionaries could recharge physically, mentally and spiritually. He found a hilly area which he deemed conducive for meditation, and on February 17, 1590, then Governor-General Santiago de Vera granted the land to the Franciscan Order.

Father Pedro Bautista built a little convent and a chapel made of bamboo and nipa palm. He dedicated the chapel to Our Lady of Montecelli and the place was opened as a house of retreat for missionaries, as a novitiate house, and as a place for reclusion of government officials.

The chapel was replaced by a wooden structure in 1591 and in 1593, clay and natural stones were used for fortification, which was also the time when the convent was constructed.  The chapel was rebuilt using adobe in 1599 as designed by Architect Domingo Ortigas.  The reconstruction was funded by Don Pedro Salazar, whereas the expansion of the convent was made possible by donations from Captain Domingo Ortiz de Chagoya.

The chapel was destroyed during the Limahong-led uprising in 1639 when the Chinese rebels used the church as headquarters.  The 1645 earthquake completely destroyed the church and the convent, leaving both structures unattended for 39 years.

Construction of the present church

Reconstruction efforts were done but were halted in 1688 because the place was declared unfit for habitation. Construction resumed in 1696 under the supervision of Fr. Francisco de Mondéjar and through the generosity of a pious person, Don Tomás de Endaya, and the stone church was completed in 1699. The convent was also reconstructed alongside the church. It was also during this time when the baroque altar was installed. The new stone church was dedicated to then newly Blessed Pedro Bautista and to his companion martyrs who were beatified by Pope Urban VIII on September 14, 1627.  They were canonized after almost a century and half on June 8, 1862 by Pope Pius IX.

Repairs were made in 1874 by a lay brother named Gabino Perez.

In 1895, the friars abandoned the place, and the following year at the time of the Cry of Balintawak, the Filipino revolutionary forces occupied the church.

In 1898, during the Philippine–American War, the American soldiers occupied the church. Then, it was left idle until it was repaired in 1912. In 1914, the church was blessed and a town fiesta was held to honor Saint Pedro Bautista.

Presumably, it survived bombardment of World War II due to the remoteness of its location at that time.

Independent parish
On November 11, 1932, the church was declared its own separate parish named in honor of its founder and patron saint, Saint Pedro Bautista. Before the decree, the parish church belonged to a parish in Caloocan (then a town northwest of San Francisco del Monte).

A historical marker was placed at the facade of the old church by the Philippine Historical Research and Markers Committee (now the National Historical Commission of the Philippines (NHCP)) in 1936 for its historical significance.

Church expansion
In the 1970s as the parish population grew, there was a need to build a bigger church.  The original stone church was expanded by removing the northeastern wall and the new nave was constructed northeastward from the wall.  With the renovation, the original church structure became the sanctuary space while the original facade and apse now appears like semitransepts of the present church. They are separated from the present sanctuary by a reinforce concrete wall with a tall archway separated from the sanctuary by a wooden partitions.  The former baroque altars became side altars and sacristy of the church.  There was a huge crucifix at the center of the sanctuary and the floor was changed to marble.  The church was built in accordance to the Second Vatican Council.

In 1989, the three-century old baroque altars were transferred to the main sanctuary in time for the celebration of the 400th anniversary of the founding of San Francisco del Monte on February 17, 1990.  The dedication ceremony of the new sanctuary was headed by the Franciscan Superior of the order. The 400th anniversary feast day celebration on February 17 was headed by Jaime Cardinal Sin, then the Archbishop of Manila.

On February 5, 1997, the parish marked the 400th Anniversary of the martyrdom of Saint Pedro Bautista. Two murals were created to commemorate the life of the founder saint, on display on each side of the sanctuary. The mural on the left side is that of the life of Pedro Bautista from Ávila, Spain to San Francisco del Monte, from teaching the natives the use of musical instruments to finding medicinal use for the natural springs of Los Baños, Laguna, to him being the founder of many towns in the Philippines from Bulacan to Bicol as attested by Mayon Volcano at the bottom right side of the mural, and from his arrival to the shores of Japan, to his death in Nagasaki. The mural on the right is that of the martyrdom scene on the hill of Nagasaki.

On February 25, 2001, the parish church was declared an archdiocesan shrine and the name was changed to Sanctuario de San Pedro Bautista (Saint Peter Baptist Shrine) in view of its historical and religious significance to the Archdiocese of Manila.

In 2003, the Diocese of Cubao was created from the Archdiocese of Manila, and the church became part of the new diocese.  The Diocesan Coat of Arms has a Tau cross on top of the hills as a reminder of the Franciscan missionary and martyr, Saint Pedro Bautista, who founded the mission and Church in San Francisco del Monte in the late 16th century before he was martyred in Japan.

Current modernization

The church initiated a currently-ongoing modernization in 2016, expanding the choirloft, upgrading the ventilation with giant overhead fans, and using modern LCD TV panels as digital signboards for church activities such as responsorial psalms. The stained glasses adorning the church was also redesigned, and the former crucifix now placed at the choirloft.

Elevation to a minor basilica 
The Diocese of Cubao announced on July 9, 2020, that the Holy See had bestowed the title of minor basilica upon the parish, making it the 17th minor basilica in the Philippines and the 2nd in the diocese.

Architectural features
The church additions was built in the Spanish Mission architecture.  In the facade are four niches with statues of the four writers of the Gospel - Saint Mark, Saint Luke, Saint Matthew and Saint John. Inside the sanctuary are the three Baroque altarpieces with statues of Christian saints. A life-size image of Saint Pedro Bautista that was added during the 400th anniversary of San Francisco del Monte, is enshrined at the center niche in the middle altarpiece. Above him is a Madonna and Child statue of Our Lady of Monticelli.  The left Baroque altarpiece is occupied with St. Clare of Assisi with Saint Dominic, the founder of the Dominican order, above her.  In the right reredos is Saint Anthony of Padua with Saint Francis of Assisi occupying the top niche.

The church is also connected to the church convent.  On the second floor are the residence rooms of the priests stationed at the parish.  There are a few gardens located in the convent area.  The church convent has a courtyard located at the back of the sanctuary that would remind people of the age of the church.  Large stones were used to build the area with a garden in honor of St. Francis of Assisi. A statue of St. Francis with his arms crossed on his chest in prayer stands in the middle of the garden.

Underneath the location of the original altar is the Holy Cave of Saint Pedro Bautista where all missionaries contemplated and communicated with God prior to their missions. The holy cave also has a bronze statue of Saint Pedro Bautista in contemplative prayer. There are kneelers available for people to pray. This cave is open to the public, but must be arranged beforehand by request. 

Outside the holy cave facing the creek, is the ossuary where the remains of some of the former priests assigned to the parish are inurned. This ossuary is exclusive for OFM friars.

Adjacent to the parish grounds is the Headquarters of the Franciscan Province of the Philippines or the Provincial House.

Parish profile 
Boundaries
The Parish of Saint Pedro Bautista covers six barangays, namely: Damayan, Del Monte, Mariblo, Paraiso, Sta. Cruz, and Talayan.  It is bounded by Pat Senador St. to the west, Quezon Avenue to the east, Araneta Avenue to the south, and Judge Juan Luna Street to the north.
Parish Church
 Santuario de San Pedro Bautista (Saint Peter Baptist Shrine)
Feast Day
 Nearest Sunday to February 5 (San Pedro Bautista) and First Saturday of August (Nuestra Señora de los Angeles de Portiuncula)
Titular saint
 Saint Pedro Bautista (Saint Peter Baptist) and Our Lady of Monticelli
Date parish was established
 November 11, 1932
Current Parish Priest
 Rev. Fr. Irineo R. Tactac, OFM
The Pastoral Team

 Fr. Irineo R. Tactac, OFM (Parish Priest)
 Fr. Elias E. Manlangit Jr., OFM (Friary Guardian)
 Fr. Bernardo M. Lanuza, OFM (Parochial Vicar/House Vicar)
 Fr. Robert John C. Abada, OFM (Bursar)
 Fr. Wilfredo S. Benito, OFM (Master of Postulants)
 Fr. Arulnesam Sebastian Lambert, OFM (Resident Friar)
 Br. Temoteo S. Gulay, OFM (Resident Friar)

Former Parish Priests

 Fr. Mariano Montero, OFM (1932–1933)
 Fr. Jose Agundez, OFM (1933–1935)
 Fr. Francisco Santos, OFM (1935–1938)
 Fr. Blas Garcia, OFM (1938–1939),
 Fr. Alejandro Carrasco, OFM (1939–1943)
 Fr. Angel Portalatin, OFM (1943–1945)
 Fr. Gerardo Chicano, OFM (1945–1954)
 Fr. Roberto Mangubat, OFM (1954–1960)
 Fr. Silvestre Murillo, OFM (1960–1964)
 Fr. Segundino Blanco, OFM (1964–1966)
 Fr. Jesus Martinez, OFM (1966–1967)
 Fr. Agapito Diez, OFM (1967)
 Fr. Jose Barullo, OFM (1967–1968)
 Fr. Leon Ramos, OFM (1968–1969)
 Fr. Agapito Diez, OFM (1969–1983)
 Fr. Alberto Baldo, OFM (1983–1989)
 Fr. Jimmy Giron, OFM (1989–1995)
 Fr. Romeo Gil Abesamis, OFM (April 1995-November 1995)
 Fr. Cielo Almazan, OFM (1995-April 1996)
 Fr. Roberto Manansala, OFM (1996–2002)
 Fr. Reu Jose Galoy, OFM (April 2002 – 2006)
 Fr. Carlos Santos, OFM (2006-December 2009)
 Fr. Romeo Floralde, OFM (December 2009-April 2010)
 Fr. Alberto Marfil, OFM (2010-2013)
 Fr. Edwin Peter Dionisio, OFM (2013–2019)

Facilities 
Schools:
 Our Lady of Montecelli Learning Center San Pedro Bautista St., Q.C.
 Cong. Reynaldo A. Calalay Memorial School F. Bautista St., Q.C.
 San Francisco Elementary School San Pedro Bautista St., Q.C.
 Dalupan Elementary School Marinduque St., Q.C.
 PMI Colleges Roosevelt Ave., Q.C.

Function Halls
 Parish Center (located across the Parish)
 Brother Sun Sister Moon Garden
 Monticelli Hall

Mortuary
 San Pedro Bautista Parish Mortuary

Religious Congregations 
Religious Men
 Congregation of Marian Fathers of the Immaculate Conception a.k.a. Marians (MIC) at 45 Jose Abad Santos St., Heroes Hill, Santa Cruz, QC
 Order of Friars Minor a.k.a. Franciscans (OFM) at 69 San Pedro Bautista St., SFDM, Q.C.

Religious Women
 Franciscans Handmaids of the Good Shepherd (FHGS) at 18 Besang Pass, Talayan Village, Q.C.

References

External links 

 San Pedro Bautista Shrine Official Website
 The Roman Catholic Diocese of Cubao

Roman Catholic churches in Quezon City
Churches in the Roman Catholic Diocese of Cubao
Cultural Properties of the Philippines in Metro Manila
Roman Catholic shrines in the Philippines
Basilica churches in the Philippines